A medallist or medalist (see spelling differences) is an artist who designs medals, plaquettes, badges, coins and similar small works in relief in metal. Art medals are a well-known and highly collected form of small bronze sculpture, most often in bronze, and are considered a form of exonumia. "Medalist/medallist" is confusingly the same word used in sport and other areas (but not usually in military contexts) for the winner of a medal as an award.  Medallists very often also design, or produce the dies for coins as well. In modern times medallists are mostly primarily sculptors of larger works, but in the past the number of medals and coins produced were sufficient to allow specialists who spent most of their career producing them.  Medallists are also often confusingly referred to as "engravers" in reference works, referring to the "engraving" of dies, although this is often in fact not the technique used; however many also worked in engraving the technique in printmaking.

Art medals have been produced since the late Renaissance period, and, after some classical precedents and Late Medieval revivals, the form was essentially invented by Pisanello, who is credited with the first portrait medal, which has remained a very popular type.  He cast them like bronze sculptures, rather than minting them like coins.

By nationality
An incomplete list, biased towards the 19th-century onwards; see also :Category:Medallists.  (Note: Where an artist is best known by other than his first given name, the commonly used name is highlighted in boldface.)

Argentina

Soto Avendaño
José Bellagamba
Alfredo Bigatti (1898 – 1964)
Ernesto de la Cárcova (1866 – 1927)
Arturo Dresco (1875 – 1961)
Juan Gottuzzo (1858 Buenos Aires – 1924 Buenos Aires)
José Horta
Jorge Maria Lubary
Victor de Pol (1865 Venice – 1925 Buenos Aires)
Affonso Rossi
Constante Rossi

Australian

 W.J. Amor, Sculptor, (1860 England – after 1947 Sydney, New South Wales)
 William Leslie Bowles, Sculptor, (1885 Leichhardt, Sydney, New South Wales - 1954 Frankston, Victoria)
 Stuart Leslie Devlin, Sculptor, (1931 Geelong, Victoria - 2018 Chichester, United Kingdom)
 Vladimir Gottwald (born 1950 in Czechia)
 Horst Hahne, Chief Engraver of the Royal Australian Mint Canberra (born 1940 in Frankfurt am Main, Germany)
 Stanley James Hammond MBE, Sculptor, 1913 Trentham, Victoria – 2000 Melbourne, Victoria
 Rayner Hoff (1894 – 1937)
 Ing Jong (since 2011 coin designer at Perth Mint)
 Sir Edgar Bertram Mackennal (1863 – 1931)
  (1900 – 1972)
  (born 1945)
 Mark Nodea (born 1968 Derby, Western Australia)
 Dora Ohlfsen (1877 – 1948)
 Wojciech Pietranik (born 1950)
 Charles Douglas Richardson (1853 – 1932) Signature: CDM
 Thomas Stokes (1831 Edgbaston, Birmingham, England – 1910 Alphington, Melbourne, Victoria) founder of Stokes & Son in 1893.
 Jeanette Timbery (born 1941 La Perouse, Sydney)

Austrian

 (born 1973 in Linz, Oberösterreich)
Michael Blümelhuber (1865 – 1936)
 (born 1924 in Vienna — died 2017 in Kirchberg am Wechsel)
Sir Joseph Edgar Boehm (1834 Vienna, Austria – 1890 London, England)
 (1869 – 1930) 
Josef Cesar (1814 – 1876)
Josef Christian Christlbauer (1827 – 1897)
Hans Dietrich (1868 – 1936)
Ignaz Donner (1752 – 1803)
 (1802 – 1974)
 (1882 – 1987)
Josef Fabi (1780 Mint-warden at Günzburg on the Maria Theresia Thalers). Signature: S.F. in conjunction with Tobias Johann Schöbel.
Emil Fuchs (1866 – 1929)
Heinrich Friedrich Füger (1751 – 1818)
Edwin Grienauer (1893 – 1964)
 (born 1933)
Grete Hartmann (1869 – 1946) née Chrobak
Philipp Häusler (1887 Panczowa, Hungary, today Pančevo, Serbia - 1966 Frankfurt am Main)
Alfred Hofmann (1879 – 1958)
Otto Hofner (1879 – 1946)
Ludwig Hujer (1872 – 1968)
Friedensreich Hundertwasser (1928 – 2000)
 (1833 – 1912)
Josef Kaiser (1954 Bač, Vojvodina -)
Heinrich Ernst Karl (1781 Vienna – 1854 Kremnitz)
Josef Köblinger (1912 Innsbruck – 1960)
 (1911 Steyr – 1995 Steyr, Oberösterreich, Austria)
Franz Kounitzky (1880 – 1928)
Ernst Wilhelm Kubiena (1902 Neutitschein, Moravia – 1973 Salzburg)
Friedrich "Franz" Leisek (died in 1898)
Rudolf Marschall (1873 – 1967)
 (1929 – 2019)

Rudolf Neuberger (1861 – 1916)
 (1865 – 1906) 
Karl Perl (1876 Liezen, Styria – 1965 Vienna)
 (born 1952 in Marchtrenk, Oberösterreich) Signature: TP
Wolfgang Pichl (born 1931 in Innsbruck, died 2003 in Linz, Austria)
Anton Pittner (1814 – 1892)
 (Bohemian, 1880–1962) 
Michael Powolny (1871 Judenburg,  Styria, Austria – 1954 Vienna)
 (1818 Vienna – 1901 Vienna)
Hans Schaefer (1875 Sternberg, Moravia – 1933 Chicago, Illinois)
 (1845 – 1903) 
Rudolf Schmidt (1894 – 1980)
 Tobias Johann Schöbel (1762 – 1789). Mint-master at Günzburg. Signature: S.F. in conjunction with Josef Fabi.
Stefan Schwartz (1851 Neutra, Hungary – 1924 Raabs an der Thaya, Austria)
Johann Schwerdtner (1834 – 1920)
Franz Stiasny (1881 – 1941)
Josef Hermann Tautenhayn (1837 – 1911)
Josef Johann Tautenhayn (1868 Speising bei Wien – 1962 Vienna)
 (1929 Matrei/Brenner, Tyrol – 2010 Vienna)
Oskar Thiede (1879 – 1961)
Ascher Wappenstein (about 1780 Kraków, today in Poland -)
Carl Waschmann (1848 – 1905)
Anton Rudolf Weinberger (1879 – 1936?)
 (1915 – 2008)
 (1753 – 1811)
Franz Zeichner (1778 – 1862)
Alfred Zierler (born 1933)
Helmut Zobl (born 1941)

Belgian

Jules Baetes (1861 – 1937)
 (1883 – 1973)
Joseph-Pierre Braemt (1796 – 1864)
Georges André Brunet (1902 Brussels – 1986)
 (Flemish) (1882 – 1966)
Albert Carlens (1789 – 1873)
Guillaume Charlier (1854 – 1925) 
Eugène Jean De Bremaecker (1879 – 1963)
Oscar de Clerck (1892 Oostende – 1968 Sint-Stevens-Woluwe)
Floris de Cuyper (1875 – 1965)
Paul De Greef (1926 – 1988)
 (1885 – 1973)
 (1786 – 1862) 
Jean-Baptiste DeKeyser (born 1857, year of death unknown)
Maxine Real Delsarte (1888 – 1954)
Victor Joseph Ghislain Demanet (1895 – 1964)
Isidore-Lievin De Rudder (1855 – 1943)
Louis-Antoine de Smeth (1883 – 1964)
Pieter De Soete (1886 – 1948)
Godefroid Devreese (1861 Courtrai (Flanders) – 1941 Brussels, Belgium)
Auguste De Wever (born 1856, year of death unknown)
Paul-Maurice Dubois (1859 – 1938)
Josuë Dupon (1864 – 1935)
 (1896 – 1967)
Toon Dupuis (1877 – 1937)
Antoine Fisch (1827 – 1892)
Joseph Fisch (1870 – 1931)
Paul Fisch (1865 Brussels - ?) son of Antoine Fisch
Jules Fonson
Édouard Louis Geerts (1846 Brussels – 1889 Ixelles) 
Léon Gobert (1869 – 1935)
Laurent Joseph Hart (1810 – 1860)
Frans Jochems (1880 – 1949)
Jules Jooris
Jules Jourdain (1873 Namur – 1957 Brussels)
Adolphe Christian Jouvenel (1798 – 1867)
 (born 1940)
Jules Lagae (1862 – 1931)
Karl Lateur
Jean Lecroart (1883 Laeken near Brussels – 1967)
 (1893 – 1976)
Hippolyte Le Roy (1857 Liège – 1943 Ghent)
Luc Luycx (born 1958)
Alfonse "Alf" Mauquoy (1880 Antwerp – 1954)
Alphonse Michaux (1860 – 1928)
 (1879 – 1958)
Joseph Arnold Pingret (1798 – 1862)
René Pirart (1887 – 1952)
(1886 – 1966)
Jacques II Roëttiers (1698 Bromley, Kent – 1772 Brussels)
Victor Rousseau (1865 – 1954)
Charles Samuel (1862 – 1939)
Henri Thiery (1875 – 1941)
Robert van de Velde (1895 – 1978)
Madeleine van Dionant (1903 – 1984)
Philo Van Riel
Geo Verbanck (1881 – 1961)
Franz Vermeylen (1857 Louvain – 1922)
 (1803 – 1883)
Thomas Jules Vinçotte (1850 Antwerp-Borgerhout – 1925 Brussels)
 (1832 – 1888)
Jacob Wiener (1815 Kamp-Lintfort-Hoerstgen – 1899 Brussels)
 (1823 – 1891)
Paul Wissaert (1885 – 1972)
Joseph Witterwulghe (1883 Brussels – 1967 Ukkel near Brussels). Engraver of medals commemorating WW1.
Marcel "Marc" Wolfers (1886 Brussels – 1976)
Philippe Wolfers (1858 – 1929) medallist? 
Jean Würden (1807 Cologne – 1874 Brussels). Signature: WURDEN

Bermudian

Eldon Trimingham III (born 1956)

British

George Gammon Adams (1821 – 1898)
Abigail Burt (born 1989). British Art Medal Society Medallist
 William Henry James Blakemore, Engraver, (1871 Birmingham, West Midlands – 1945 Croydon, South London) Signature: WHJB
Sir Joseph Edgar Boehm (1834 Vienna, Austria – 1890 London, England)
Matthew Boulton (1728 Birmingham – 1809 Birmingham)
Frank Bowcher (1864 Islington – 1938 London)
Sir Thomas Brock (1847 – 1922)
William Brown (Gem-engraver) (1748 – 1825 London)

Linda Crook (born 1943). British Art Medal Society Medallist
Joseph Davis (died c. 1857)
Ron Dutton (born 1935). British Art Medal Society Medallist
George William de Saulles (1862 – 1903) Signatures: "DES", "DS", or "WS".
Robert Elderton (Born 1948)
Elkington & Co. (1861 Birmingham - 1963)
Thomas Fattorini Ltd (from c 1860s). British Art Medal Society Medallist
Arthur Fenwick (active in Birmingham 1888 - 1951)
Joseph Fray (active in Birmingham 1873 - 1951)
William Maving Gardner (1914 – 2000). Signature WG
Ernest George Gillick (1874 – 1951)
Mary Gaskell Gillick OBE (1881 – 1965)

Thomas Halliday (c. 1780–?)
John Gregory Hancock (active in Birmingham 1775 – 1815)
Ralph Heaton & Sons Signature H (Heaton's Mint), Birmingham
John Henning (Scottish) (1771 – 1851)
Michael Hibbit, (born 1947 in London, died 2009 in Seattle)
Mathew Holland, of Bigbury Mint Ltd (Born 1963), British Art Medal Society Medallist, Bigbury Mint also award the Annual Student Medal Prize 
Thomas Wells Ingram (1799 Warwickshire – 1844 Birmingham, England)
Christopher Ironside, OBE (1913 London, England – 1992 Winchester, Hampshire)
Henry Kettle & Sons (active in Birmingham 1792 – 1830)
George Kruger Grey (1880 London, England – 1943 Chichester West Sussex, England). Signature: GK
Alphonse Legros (1837 – 1911). British Art Medal Society Medallist
John Lobban (1919-1996) "one of Britain’s foremost numismatic artists" — ref British Art Medal Society (BAMS)
Arthur Immanuel Loewental (1879 – 1964)
Arnold Machin (1911 Stoke-on-Trent, Staffordshire – 1999 Eccleshall near Stoke-on-Trent, Staffordshire, England), Signature: RDM
John Maine (born 1942). British Art Medal Society Medallist
Raphael David Maklouf (born 1937 in Jerusalem, Israel)
Percy Metcalfe (1895 – 1970)
George Mills (1792/3 – 1824)
John Mills (1933-2019)

Nichola Moss (born 1962). British Art Medal Society Medallist
Philip R. Nathan (born 1941) Signature: PN
Jane McAdam Freud (born 1958)
Johann Rudolf Ochs (1704 Berne, Switzerland – 1788 London)
John Ottley (active in Birmingham 1790 – 1850)
Thomas Ottley (active in Birmingham 1852 – 1931)
 Martin Page. British Art Society (BAMS) Medallist
Thomas Humphrey Paget, Sculptor, (1893 Watford, Hertfordshire near London, England – 1974 Sussex). Signature: HP
Ronald Penell (born 1935). British Art Society (BAMS) Medallist
John Phillp (1778 Falmouth, Cornwall – 1815 Birmingham). Artist at Boulton's Soho Mint since 1793.
Francis Phillips
Catherine Pilkington
John Pinches (1916 – 2007)
John Pinches Snr (1825 Birmingham – 1905 London)
John Harvey Pinches (1852 – 1941)
John Robert Pinches (1884 – 1968)
Thomas Ryan Pinches (1825 Birmingham – ?)
John Pingo (1738 – 1827)
Lewis Pingo (1743 – 1830)
Thomas Pingo Jr (1714 – 1776)
Thomas Pingo Sr. (1688 – after 1743)
Benedetto Pistrucci (1783 – 1855); became English Chief engraver
Felicity Powell (1961-2015)
Edward Carter Preston (1885-1965)
Ian Rank-Broadley, coin designer (born 1952 in Walton-on-Thames, Surrey England). Signature: IRB
Natasha Ratcliffe (born 1982). British Art Medal Society Medallist
Sara Richards
Michael Rizzello (1926 – 2004)
John Roettiers (1631 – 1703)
Ronald Searle (1920-2011). British Art Medal Society Medallist
Bernard Ralph Sindall (1925 Surbiton, Surrey – 1998)
Danuta Soloweij-Wedderburn (born 1962). British Art Medal Society Medallist. Coin designer
Jaqueline Stieger (born 1936). British Art Medal Society Medallist
Avril Vaughan (1937-2008) Coin & Medal designer. British Art Medal Society Medallist
Thomas Webb (fl. 1797 – 1830)*J.A. Wylie (active 1914 – 1940)
David Wynne (1926 – 2014)
Alfred Benjamin Wyon (1837 – 1884)
Joseph Shepherd Wyon (1836 – 1873)
Leonard Charles Wyon (1826 – 1891)
Thomas Wyon the elder (1767 – 1830)
Thomas Wyon the younger (1792 – 1817)
William Wyon (1795 – 1851)

Bulgarian

Blagovest Georgiev Apostolov (born 1953 Sofia)
Alexander Haytov (born 1954)
Sneschana Russewa-Hoyer (born 1953 Krushari)

Canadian

Walter Seymour Allward (1876 – 1955)
Patrick Brindley, Chief engraver Royal Canadian Mint ( – 1989 Ottawa). Signature: B
Henry Birks (1840 – 1928)
Paul Cederberg (1932 Toronto – 2014 Ottawa) Signature: PC
Elizabeth Bradford Holbrook (1913 – 2009)
Christian Cardell Corbet (born 1966)
Emily S. Damstra (born 20th century last quarter)
Ken Danby (1940 - 2007)
Emanuel Otto Hahn (1881 Reutlingen (today Baden-Württemberg), Germany – 1957 Toronto, Canada)
 (1930 Gravelbourg, Saskatchewan – 2002 Montréal)
Jaroslav F. Huta (born 1940 Czechoslovakia)
John Jaciw (Graphic Designer, born 1932 Kolynci, Ukraine -)
Orazio Lombardo (1926 Milan, Italy – ) founder of Lombardo Mint, a Mississauga Mint division 
R. Tait McKenzie (1867 – 1938)
Dora de Pedery-Hunt (1913 – 2008)
 (born 1931 in San Feliu de Guixols, Spain)
Thomas Shingles (1903 – 1984)
Benjamin Trickett Mercer (born 1991)
Leo Yerxa (1947 - 2017)

Costa Rican

Juan (Johann) Barth (essayer San José mint, 1847–1864). Signature J.B.

Croatian

Frano Menegello Dinčić (1900 – 1986)
Ivo Kerdić (1881 – 1953)
Francesco Laurana (c. 1430  – 1502)

Czech

 (1889 – 1969)
 (1928 Harrachov – 2013 Prague)
 (1886 – 1983)
Zdeněk Kolarsky (born 1931 in Kostelec nad Orlicí, Bohemia)
Mario Korbel (1882 – 1954)
 (born 1938)
Josef Václav Myslbek (1848 – 1922)
Věnoval Pichl (1741-1805)
Marian Polonski (born 1933)
Václav Adolf Kovanič (1911 - 1999)
Lubomir Ruzicka (born 1938 in Vyškově, Moravia)
Jan Solpera (1939 Hradec – )
Otakar Španiel (Bohemian) (1881 – 1955)
Ivan Strnad (1926 – 2005)

Danish

 (1863 – 1948) Signature: GJ
Hans Peter Sophus Lindahl (1849 Køge-1935 Copenhagen)
Anders Nyborg (born 1934 in Gentofte, Capital Region of Denmark)
 (1810 – 1892)
Vilhelm Buchard Poulsen (Mint-master Royal Mint of Copenhagen 1893-1918), signature VBP 
 (1900 – 1990) 
Anton Schultz (active in Copenhagen 1716 – 1724, from 1724 active in Moscow, died there 1736)
Bertel Thorvaldsen (1770 – 1844)
Hanne Varming (born 1939)

Dutch

Floris de Cuyper (1875 – 1965)
Dr Copius Hoitsema (1867 Groningen – 1958 Zuidlaren)
Romeyn de Hooghe (1645 Amsterdam – 1708 Haarlem)
Frederik Engel Jeltsema (1879 – 1971)
Johan Philip van der Kellen (1831 Utrecht - 1906 Baarn). Signature: VDK
Bruno Ninaber van Eyben (born 1950 Boxtel)
Eugène Lacomblé (1828 Brussels – 1905 Arnhem)
Hendrix Lageman (1765 – 1816)
Yman Dirk Christiaan Suermondt (1792 Rotterdam – 1871 Utrecht), mint-master in Utrecht 1815-1838.
Willem Vis (1936 Leiden – 2007)
Salomon Isaac de Vries (1816 The Hague – 1886 Amsterdam), signature: S. de Vries
Ludwig Oswald Wenckebach (1895 – 1962)
Johann Cornelius Wienecke (1872 – 1945)

Finnish
 (1889-1980). Coin design OLYMPIA HELSINKI 1952
 (1911-1987)
Heikki Häiväoja (1929-2019)
Raimo Heino (1932 Helsinki – 1995 Helsinki)
Eila Hiltunen (1922 – 2003)
(born 1940)
Gerda Franziska Qvist (1883 – 1957)
 (1926 – 2015)
Walter Runeberg (1838 – 1920)
 (1885 – 1957). Coin design OLYMPIA HELSINKI 1952

French

Henri Émile Allouard (1844 Paris – 1929)
Léonce Alloy (fl. 1899 – 1942)
Charles Altorffer (1809 Strasbourg – 1887)
René Jean Louis Andréi (1906-1987)
Jean-Bertrand Andrieu (1761 – 1822)
Arthus-Bertrand (founded in Paris in 1803)
Roger B. Baron (1907 – 1994) 
Albert Désiré Barre (1818 – 1878)
Jean-Auguste Barre (1811 – 1896)
Jacques-Jean Barre (also often styled "Jean-Jacques Barre", 1793 – 1855)
Anna Bass (1876-1961)
René Baudichon (1878 – 1963)
Léon-Georges Baudry (1898 – 1978)
Lucien Georges Bazor (1889 – 1974)
 (1871 – 1971)
Paul Belmondo  (1898 – 1982)
Raoul René Alphonse Bénard (1881 – 1961)
Arthus Claude Bertrand (mint founded 1803 in Paris) signature: A. Bertrand
Louis Charles Beylard (1843 – 1925)
(1913 – 1994)
Jane L. Blanchot (1884-1979)
 (1868 – 1947)
Édouard-Pierre Blin (1877 Chartres - 1946 Paris) 
 (1872 – 1925) He is a sculptor, for medallist 
Michel Eugène Blondelet (1840 Paris – 1929 Paris)
Émile André Boisseau (1842 – 1923)
 (1836 – 1927)
Louis-Alexandre Bottée (1852 – 1940)
Louis Maximilien Bourgeois (1839 – 1901) 
Brassaï (Gyula Halász) (1899 – 1984)
 (1773 – 1846)
Nicholas Briot (1579 – 1646)
Laurent Burger (1897 – 1969)
 (Chief engraver of La Monnaie de Paris 2001) (born 1944)
Jean Marie Camus (1877 Clermont-Ferrand – 1955 Paris)
 (1793 Saintes – 1881 Paris)
Claude Cardot (born 1934 Saint-Etienne)
Lucien Jean Henri Cariat (1874 – 1925)
Francis Cartaux (active in Paris from the end of the 19th to the start of the 20th centuries)
Louis-Félix Chabaud (1824 – 1902)
Jules-Clément Chaplain (1839 – 1909)
Pierre Puvis de Chavannes (1824 – 1898) 
Raymond Corbin (1907 – 2002)
 (born 1875, year of death unknown) medallist?
François André Clémencin (born 1878, year of death unknown) medallist? 
Robert Cochet (1903 – 1988)
 (1891-1984)
 (1907 – 2002)
Marie Alexandre-Lucien Coudray (1864 Paris – 1932) 
Marcel Louis Maurice Courbier (1898 – 1976)
 (born 1970 in Villeneuve-Saint-Georges (Val-de-Marne))
Robert Coutre (born 1915)
 (1904 – 1976)
Paul-Marcel Dammann (1885 – 1939?) 
 (1849 – 1899)
Joseph Dantzell (1805 Lyons – 1877 Paris)
 (1873 – 1954?) 
Georgette Daveline (1902-?) 
Pierre-Jean David d'Angers (1788 – 1856)
Louis Auguste Ernest Davin (1866 Saint-Michel-en-Beaumont – 1937 Grenoble)
Charles-Jean-Marie Degeorge (1837 – 1888)
Raymond Henri Philippe Delamarre (1890 – 1986)
 (1885 – 1972)
Jean  Delpech
Jean-Marie Delpech (1866 Banios – 1929)
(1909-2003) medallist?
Dominique-Vivant Denon (1747 – 1825)
Alexis Joseph Depaulis (1792 – 1867) 
Albin François de Possesse (born 1888, year of death unknown)
Jean-Pierre Casimir de Marcassus, Baron de Puymaurin (1757 – 1841)
 (1850-1911)
 (1851 – 1935)
 (1860 – 1928)
Joseph François Domard (1792 – 1858)
Jean-Baptiste Émile Dropsy (1848 – 1923)
Henri Dropsy (1885 – 1969)
 (1831 Paris – 1905 Clamart)
 (1859 – 1943)
 (1795 – 1863)
Thérèse Dufresne (1937 Madagascar - 2010)
Auguste Dujardin (1847 Paris - 1925 Essey-lès-Nancy)
Rambert Dumarest (1750 – 1806)
Augustin Dupré (1748 – 1833)
 (1869 – 1909)
Guillaume Dupré (1574 – 1643) 

Amédée Pierre Durand (1789 Paris – 1873)
Pierre-Simon-Benjamin Duvivier (1730 – 1819) 
Johanna Ebertz (1944 Wetzlar, Germany –  )
Claude Emmel
Étienne-Victor Exbrayat (1879 – 1914)
Richard-Camille Fath (1900 – 1952) Signature: FATH
Charles Maurice Favre-Bertin (1887 Paris - 1960 Clichy)
Daniel Gerard Flourat (1928 Paris – 1968 Bry-sur-Marne)
Charles Forster (19th century)
Édouard Fraisse (1880 – 1945)
Jean Gallo (born 1916)
 (1908 – 1998)
Hippolyte Marius Galy (1847-1929)
Jacques-Édouard Gatteaux (1788 – 1881)
Raymond Gayrard (1777 – 1858)
Lucien Gibert (1904 Saint-Etienne – 1988)
Ferdinand Gilbault (1837 – 1926)
Émile Gilioli (1911 – 1977)
Léon Gobert (1869 – 1935) medallist? 
Paul Grandhomme (1851 Paris – 1944 Saint-Briac-sur-Mer, Ille-et-Vilaine, France)
 (1877 – 1967)
Henri-Léon Gréber (1855 – 1941)
 (1871 – 1945)
Hélène Guastalla (1903 Paris – 1983 Nice)
Paul Louis Guilbert (1886 - 1952) medallist?
Octave Denis Victor Guillonnet (1872 – 1967) 
 (1901 – 1989)
Aleth Jeanne Antoinette Guzman-Nageotte (1904 – 1978)
 (1855 – 1934)
Jacques Hardy
Josette Hébert-Coëffin (1906 – 1973)
Auguste Albert Herbemont (1874 Paris - 1953)
Benoit Lucien Hercule (1846 – 1913)
Henri Théodore Martin Herluison (1835 – 1905)
Léon Auguste César Hodebert (1854? – 1914) medallist? 
 (born 1935)
Albert de Jaeger (1908 Roubaix - 1992 Paris)
Romain-Vincent Jeuffroy (1749 - 1826) 
 (born 1956)
Jean Joachim (1905 Levallois-Perret – 1990 Paris)
 (1911 Paris – 2006)
 (1973 Bouaké, Ivory Coast)
 (1855 – 1935)
Abel Lafleur (1875 – 1953)
 (1831 – 1908)
René J. Lalique (1860 – 1945)
Léon Lamer (1889 – 1926)
Raoul-Eugène Lamourdedieu (1877 – 1953)
Alfred Désiré Lanson (1851 – 1898) 
André-Marie Lavrillier (1885 – 1958)
 (1890 – 1958)
Jean Le Blanc (1677 – 1749)
Arthur Jacques Le Duc (1848 – 1918)
Hippolyte-Jules Lefèbvre (1863 – 1935)
Jules-Prosper Joseph Marie Edmond Legastelois (1855 Paris – 1931)
Alphonse Legros (1837 – 1911)
René Leleu (1911 – 1984)
Georges Henri Lemaire (1853 – 1914)
Pierre-Charles Lenoir (1878 – 1953)
Claude Lesot  (1933 –  )
Jules Auréle L'Hommeau (1867-1938)
Marcel Prosper Lordonnois (1876 Paris – 1926)
Auguste Maillard (1864 – 1944) 
Claude-Léon Mascaux (1882 – 1965)
André Arthur Paul Massoulle (1851 Epernay – 1901 Paris)
Louis Maubert (1875 Paris – 1949 Nice)
Jean Mauger (1648 – 1712)
Marius-Jean-Antonin Mercié (1845 – 1916)
J.(Giacomo Jaques) Merculiano (1859 – 1935)
 (1903 – 1990)
 (1815 – 1883)
Auguste-François Michaut (1786 – 1879)
Gustave Frédéric Michel (1851 – 1924)
Émile Adolphe Monier (1883 – 1970)
Jean-Pierre Montagny (1789 – 1862)
Blanche Adèle Moria (1859 – 1927)
 (1878 – 1951)
Mélanie "Anie" Mouroux (1887-1978)
 (1902 – 1957)
Henri Naudé (1859 Brégnier-Cordon, Ain – ?)
Henri Éduard Navarre (1885 Paris  – 1971 Paris)
Paul François Niclausse (1879 – 1958)
Eugène André Oudiné (1810 – 1887) Signature: E.A. Oudiné
Henri Auguste Jules Patey (1855 – 1930)
 (1872 – 1955)
Jean William Henri Pécou (1854 Bordeaux - 1920)
Raymond "Ray" Pelletier (1907 – 1958)
Adolphe Penin (1888 – 1985)
 (1830 – 1868)
Marius Penin (1807 – 1883)
Paul Penin (1921 – 2017 Lyon)
 (1840 – 1918)
Henri Marius Petit (1913 Paris – 2009 Boulogne-Billancourt)
Jean Claude Petit (1819 Besançon - 1903 Paris)
Louis-Michel Petit (1791 – 1844)
Émile Edmond Peynot (1850 – 1932)
Charles-Louis Picaud (1855 Lyon - 1934)
Charles Philippe Germain Aristide Pillet (1869 – 1960)
Pierre Marie Poisson (1876 – 1953)
 (1933 – 2017)
Hubert Ponscarme (1827 – 1903)
Pierre Pradeilhes (1919 – 2003) 
Victor-Émile Prouvé (1858 – 1943)
 (1873 – 1947)

Denis Fernand Py (1887 – 1949)
Madeleine Pierre Quérolle (born 1914)
 (1893 – 1974)
Dr Paul M. L. Pierre Richer (1849 – 1933)
Georges Ridet (1906 – 1967)
André Adolphe Rivaud (1892 Paris – 1951)
 (1855 Périgueux – 1925 Gentilly (Seine))
Pierre Roche (1855 – 1922)
Charles Norbert Roettiers (1720 – 1772)
Joseph-Charles Roettiers (1691/2 – 1779)
Émile Rogat (1770 – 1852) 
Louis-Oscar Roty (1846 – 1911)
Charles René de Paul de Saint-Marceaux (1845 – 1915)
André Pierre Salès (born 1860 Perpignan, year of death unknown)
Sylvain Salières (1865, Escorneboeuf, Gers - 1920 Pittsburgh, USA)
André Pierre Schwab (1883 Nancy – 1969)
Georges Simon (1906 – 1982)
Moïse Stern (1826 Haguenau, Alsace - 1915 Paris) 
René Stern (1862 Paris - 1940) 
Gérard Suzeau-Villeneuve (1938 -  )
 (1839 – 1921)
Maurice René G. Thénot (1893 – 1963)
Gravure des Métaux Thévenon & Cie (1893 – 1963)
Nicolas-Pierre Tiolier (1784 Paris – 1853 Paris) Signature: N. Tiolier
Pierre-Joseph Tiolier (1763 – 1819)
 (1916 – 1998)
 (1891 – 1968)
Georges Urbain (1872 – 1938) medallist? 
 (1818 – 1899)
Antoine Vechte (1800 – 1868 Avallon, Burgundy) 
Frédéric-Charles-Victor de Vernon (1858 – 1912)
 (1803 – 1883)
Élie Jean Vézien (1890 – 1982)
Charles Louis Eugène Virion (1865 – 1946)
Jean Warin, or Varin (1604 – 1672)
Hubert Yencesse (1900 – 1987) medallist? 
Ovide Yencesse (1869 – 1947)

German

Abraham Abramson (1754 – 1811) 
 (1846 – 1923) 
Ernst Barlach (1870 – 1938)
Egon Beckenbauer (1913 – 1999) 
 (1772 – 1830)
Gertrud Bergmann (1910 – 1985) 
Josef Bernhart (1883 – 1967) 
Axel Bertram (1936-2019)
 (1599 – after 1689)
Alois Börsch (1855 – 1923) 
Rudolf Bosselt (1871 – 1938) 
Ferdinand von Brakenhausen (1835 – 1895) 
Friedrich Brehmer (1815 – 1889)
 (1959 Neuruppin –  )
 (1729 – 1790)
Hans Karl Burgeff (1928 – 2005)
Ludwig Burger (1825 – 1884)
Georg Christoph Busch (died 1811) Mint-master in Ratisbon, Bavaria, 1773 – 1809. Signature B
, (born 1943 in Kolín, Bohemia)
 (1866 – 1906)
 (1586 – 1657) 
Maximilian Dasio (1865 – 1954) 
Karl Dautert (1875 Frankfurt am Main – 1944/45 Berlin)
 (1876 – 1971) 
Gottlob August Dietelbach (1806 Stetten im Remstal - 1870 Stuttgart). Signature: D
 (1934-2010)
 (1750 – 1835)
 (1886 – 1914)
, (1933 Groß Miltzow-Kreckow – 2011 Berlin)
Friedrich Drake (1805 – 1882)
Lissy Eckart-Aigner (1891 – 1974) 
 (born 1931 in Düsseldorf)
Benno Elkan (1877 – 1960) 
Veitel Heine Ephraim (1703 Berlin – 1775) 
 (1888 – 1955) 
Angelica Facius (1806 Weimar – 1887)
Friedrich Wilhelm Facius (1764 Greiz - 1843 Weimar)
  (1805 – 1866)
  (1802 – 1865)
Wilfried Fitzenreiter (1932 – 2008)
Else Fürst (1873 – 1943)
 (born 1946)
 (born 1942)
 (1875 – 1950) 
Theodor von Gosen (1873 – 1943)
Friedrich Hermann Werner Graul (1905 – 1984)
Hugo Grünthal, owner of Robert Ball Nachf. Berlin, (1869 Beuthen – 1943 Berlin)
Arthur K. Grupp, (1929 Plochingen  – )
Heinrich Gube (∗ 1802 Breslau (Prussia),† 1848 St. Petersburg)
 (born 1872, year of death unknown) 
 (1925 – 2004)
Georg Hautsch (1659 Nürnberg – 1745 Vienna)
 (1923 – 2002)
Lorenz Hoffstätter (1904 – 1787)
 (1907 – 1995)
Ludwig Hohlwein (1874 – 1949)
 (1890 – 1970)
Martin Holtzhey (1697 – 1764)
, (1873 – 1945)
, (1875 – 1958)
, (born 1949 Elxleben)
August Hummel (1866 – 1933)
Johann Ludwig Jachtmann (1776 - 1842)
Anton Zvone Jezovsek (born 1935 Slovenia, died 2017)
Horst Rainer Kerger (born 1943 Düsseldorf) Signature: HRK monogram
Richard Klein (1890 – 1967)
 (born 1939 Cochem, Mosel)
 (1756 – 1838)
 (1934-2017)
Heinrich Körner (1908 – 1993 Esslingen)
Karl Reinhard Krüger (1794 Dresden – 1879 Dresden). Signature: R. K.
 (1869 – 1947)
Ludwig Christoph Lauer (1817 – 1873)
 (1928 – 2012)
Arthur Lewin-Funcke (1866 - 1937)
Gerhard Lichtenfeld (1921 – 1978)
 (1735 Altenburg an der Pleisse – 1819 Berlin)
Friedrich Wilhelm Loos (about 1767 Magdeburg – after 1816 before 1819)
 (1773 Berlin – 1843)
 (1810 – 1888)
Johann Jacob Lorenz (1845 – 1887)
Valentin Maler (about 1540 – 1603)
Prof. Rudolf Mayer  (1846 Nýdek - 1916 Karlsruhe)
Wilhelm Mayer  (born in 1840, year of death unknown)
 (1872 Kiel – 1945 Torgau)
 (1896 – 1968) 
Georg Mueller, Sculptor of the Munich Secession, (1880 Munich – 1952 München)
Philipp Heinrich Müller (1654 – 1719)
August Neuss (medallist in Augsburg 1840 – 1870)
Johann Jakob Neuss  (1770 – 1847)
  (1910 – 1996)
Hermann Noack (1867 – 1941)
August Friedrich von Nordheim (1813 Heinrichsdorf bei Suhl, Thuringia – 1884 Frankfurt am Main, Germany)
 (born 1943 Stuttgart)
Otto Oertel (died in 1892)
Louis Oppenheim (1879 – 1936)
Erich Ott (born 1944 Oberammergau, Bavaria) 
 (1801 – 1861)
 (1777 Landshut – 1834)
 (1750 – 1831)
 (1910 – 1986)
 (1818 – 1901)
 (1872 – 1935)
 (1740 – 1814)
Heinz Rodewald (1932 Zduńska Wola, Poland – 1993 Berlin)
 (1934 – 2014)
Wilhelm von Rümann (1850 – 1906)
Sneschana Russewa-Hoyer (born 1953 Krushari)
Emil Schilling (1864-1933)
Karl Friedrich Schinkel (1781 – 1841)
Johann Wilhelm Schlemm Mint-master at Clausthal 1753 – 1788†. Signature: I.W.S 
Christian Schnitzspahn (1829 – 1877)
 (1915 – 2005)
Kurt Schumacher (1905 – 1942)
 (1906 Dessau – 1998 Dessau)
 (1887 – 1947)
Heinrich von Schwabe (1847 – 1907)
Hans Schwegerle (1882 – 1950) 
Renée Sintenis (1888 – 1965)
 (born 1936 in Dresden)
Paul Sturm (1859 Leipzig, Saxony – 1936 Jena, Germany) 
Alfred Thiele (1886 – 1957)
Diedrich Uhlhorn (1764 – 1837)
Carl Vezerfi-Clemm (1939 – 2012)
 (1886 – 1944)
 (1881 – 1956) Signature: G·V 
 (1800 – 1874) 
Joseph Wackerle (1890 – 1950)
Heinrich Maria Waderé (1865 – 1950)
 (born 1945 in Spremberg)
 (born 1942 in Berlin)
 (see Lippold Wefer)
Lippold Wefer (Mint Master in Clausthal, Harz, 1640 – 1674)
 (1888 – 1970)
 (1837 – 1906)
Emil Rudolf Weiss (1875 – 1942)
Richard Martin Werner (1903 – 1949)
Franz Wilhelm(1846 – 1938)
 (1926 – 2015)
 (established 1810 by Martin Heinrich Wilkens)
Albert Wolff (1814 – 1892)
Albert Moritz Wolff (1854 – 1923) 
Arnold Zadikow (1884 – 1943)
Christian Zollmann (Medallist and mint engraver at Wiesbaden 1845 – 1859) Signature: C. ZOLLMANN

Greek

Giorgos Stamatopoulos (1963 Athens – )

Hungarian

Tamás Asszonyi (born 1942)
Eszter Balás (born 1947)
Lajos Berán (1882 Budapest – 1943 Budapest)
György Bognár (born 1944 Budapest) Signature: BGY
Miklós Borsos (1906 – 1990)
Jenő Bory (1879 – 1959)
 (1910 – 2010)
Tibor Budahelyi (born 1945)
Sándor Csepregi (born 1950)
Róbert Csíkszentmihály (born 1940 Budapest)
Tibor Csiky (1932 – 1989)
Viktória Csúcs (1934 Kiskunhalas – 1993) Signature: CSV
Antal Czinder (born 1937)
István Béla Farkas (1915 – 2005)
Béni Ferenczy (1890 – 1967)
Ferenc Friedrich (born 1946)
Mihály Fritz (born 1947)
Gábor Gáti (born 1937)
István Iván (1905 Szombathely – 1967 Budapest)
Gyula Halász (1899 – 1984)
György Holdas (born 1944)
 (born 1952)
György Kiss (1943-2016)
 (1930 – 1997)
János Konyorcsik (1926 – 2010)
József Kótai (born 1940 Sopron). Signature KJ
László Kutas (born 1936)
András Lapis (born 1942 Kecskemét, Hungary)
Roland Ferenc Lieb (born 1976)
 (1934 – 2004)
 (1950-2012)
Gyula Murányi (1881 – 1920)
Pál Patzo (1886 – 1945)
József Reményi (1887 – 1977)
E. Tamás Soltra (born 1955)
Tamás Somogyi (born 1950)
 (born 1947)
László Szlávics, Jr. (born 1959)
László Szunyogh (born 1956)
Enikő Szöllőssy (born 1939)
Eduard Telcs (1872 Baja, Hungary - 1948 Budapest)
 (1949 – 2008)
 (1939-2019) Signature: TS
Carl Vezerfi-Clemm (1939 – 2012)
 (1926-2010)
Fülöp Zoltán (1951 Budapest – 2004 Budapest). Monogram "FZ" 
Képíró Zoltán (1944 Budapest – 1981 Budapest). Monogram "KZ" 
Ildikó Zsemlye (born 1969)

Irish

Gabriel Hayes 
Jarlath Fabian Hayes

Israeli

Zvi Narkiss (1921 Botoșani, Romania - 2010)
Reuven Rubin (1893 – 1974)
Eliezer Weishoff (born 1938)

Italian

Giovanni Guido Agrippa (c. 1501)
Costantino Affer (1906 Milano – 1987 Milano, Italy), Designer. Signature: COST· AFFER
Pietro Annigoni (1910 – 1988) 
Donnino Bentelli (1807 – 1885)
Antonio Bert  (1904 San Pietro a Sieve – 1990 Sesto Fiorentino, Italy)
Francesco Bianchi (1842 Rome – 1918 Rome)
Bini Bino (1916 Florence -  2007 Florence)
 (1933 – 2005)
 (1868 Milan -  1929 Milan)
Francesco Broggi (died in 1857)
Camello (surname of Vittore Gambello)
Pietro Canonica (1869 – 1959)
Angelo Cappuccio (1855 Milan - 1918)
 (born 1956 in Nettuno, Province Rome) Signature: MAC
Giannino Castiglioni (1884 Milan – 1971 Lierna, Como)
Vincenzo Catenacci (1786 – 1855)
 (1770 – 1856)
Nicola Cerbara (1796 – 1869) 
Pietro Cinganelli
 (born 1963 Rome)
 (1789 – 1867)
Laura Cretara (born 1939 in Rome)
 (born 1949 Tarcento)
Antonio Fabris (1792 – 1865)
 (1794 – 1869)
Filarete (about 1400 – 1469)
 (born 1957 in Buenos Aires)
 (1898 Urbignacco di Buja, Province of Udine, Italy – 1998 Rome)
 (1811 – 1841)
Luigi Giorgi (1848 Lucca – 1912 Rome)
Stefano Girola
 (1780 – 1851)
Pietro Girometti (1811 – 1859) 
 (1906 Anagni, Province Frosinone, Italy – 2003 Anagni)
Emilio Greco (1923 Catania, Sicily – 1995 Rome)
Alberto Hamerani (1620 – 1677)
Giovanni Martino Hamerani (1646 – 1705)
Ottone Hamerani (1694 – 1768)
Gioacchino Hamerani (1766 – 1797)
Giovanni Hamerani (1774 – 1846)
Michele Laudicina
Francesco Laurana (c. 1430  – 1502)
 (c. 1770 – 1826)
Leone Leoni (1509 – 1590)
Lodovico Leoni (1531 – 1606)
Daniela Longo (born 1968)
Luigi Mainoni (died in 1853)
 (died in 1855)
 (1771 – 1840)
 (born 1949 in Rome)
 (1758 – 1821)
J.(Giacomo Jaques) Merculiano (1859 – 1935)
 (born 1963 Rome)
Guerrino Mattia Monassi 1918 Buja, Italy – 1981 Zingonia, near Bergamo, Italy
Attilio Silvio Mottii (1867 – 1935)
Vittorio Nesti
Giovanni Pasinati (born 1755, year of death unknown)
Giuseppe Pasinati (1756 – 1829)
Salvator Passamonti
Domenico Perger Chief-engraver Naples Mint 1760 - 1820
 (born 1959)
 (1898 Borgetto (Palermo) – 1978 Rome) 
Pisanello (1395 – 1455)
Domenico Poggini (1520 – 1590)
Victor de Pol (1865 Venice – 1925 Buenos Aires)
Giovanni Pietro de Pomis (ca.1565 or 1569/70 – 6 March 1633)
Francesco Putinati (c. 1775 – 1848)
 (1872 Bologna – 1966 Rome)
Orietta Rossi (born 1968 Rome)
Enrico Saroldi (1878 – 1954)
Gregorio Sciltian (1900 – 1985)
 (born 1957)
 (1848 San Martino al Cimino – 1903 Rome)
Niccolò di Forzore Spinelli (1430 Arezzo – 1514 Florence)
Roberto Terracini, Sculptor, (1900 Torino – 1976 Torino)
Luigi Teruggi Sculptor (born 1934 Fontaneto d'Agogna)
Gabriella Titotto Sculptor (born 1970 Rome)
Jacopo da Trezzo (c. 1515 or 1519 – 1589), or Jacometrezo in Spain. Born in Italy, moved to Spain 
Girolamo Vassallo (1771 – 1819)
Goffredo Verginelli (1911 – 1972)
 (1926 Rome – 2013 Rome)
Giovan Battista Vichi (1774 – 1849)
Jorio Vivarelli Sculptor (1922 Fognano, near Pistoia, Italy – 2008 Pistoia)
Bonfiglio Zaccagnini (1793 – 1867)
Gaetano Zapparelli (1792 – 1863)

Japanese

Shigeo Fukuda (1932 Tokyo – 2009 Tokyo)

Latvian

Jānis Tilbergs (1880 Riga, Russian Empire – 1972 Riga, Latvian SSR)
Rihards Zariņš (1869 Kocēni, Latvia – 1939 Riga)

Lebanese

Paul Koroleff (1896 St Petersburg, Russia – 1992 Beirut, Lebanon)

Lithuanian

Juozas Kalinauskas (born 1935)
Juozas Zikaras (1881 – 1944)

Luxembourg

Charlotte Engels (1920 – 1993)
Yvette Gastauer-Claire (born 1957 Esch-sur-Alzette)
 (1914 Steinsel-Müllendorf – 2000 Luxembourg)
Julien Lefèvre (1907 Esch-Uelzecht – 1984 Luxembourg)
 (1904 Tashkent – 1981 Luxembourg)
Auguste Trémont (1892 – 1980)

Monégasque

Pierre Lovy

New Zealand

Reginald George James Berry OBE (1906 London-Dulwich – 1979 Auckland, New Zealand) Signature: JB
William Rose Bock (1847 – 1932)
G. Coates & Co. Christchurch (Established by Giles Coates 1851 in Nelson, and removed 1861 to Christchurch). Mint of the award medal for the New Zealand Interprovincial Exhibition 1872 Christchurch.
Robert Maurice Conly (1920 – 1995)
Harry Dansey MBE (1920 Auckland – 1979 Auckland, New Zealand)
David Hakaraia Wellington. Designer of NZ coins. (born 1977 at Tokoroa, New Zealand)
Thomas Hugh Jenkin (born 1899 Surrey, England)
Saint Andrew Matautia, NZ Post Wellington (born 1984 in Apia, Samoa), designer of the New Zealand 2020 Rowi Kiwi coins.
Leonard Cornwall Mitchell (1901 Wellington, New Zealand - 1971)
Marian Fountain (Born 1960)
Hagbarth Ernest Möller (1870 Dunedin – 1936 Dunedin, New Zealand)
Dave Martin Robertson (coin designer since 2011)
Frederick Charles William Staub (1919 – 2012) Signature: FS
Michel Tuffery (Artist in Wellington, NZ coin design 2012 "Friendship New Zealand & Samoa")
Christopher (Chris) Waind (NZ coin designer 2006 "Gold Rushes")
Heath Adam Wilkes (coin designer since 2011)
Ken Wright (born about 1955 in England), Papamoa, Bay of Plenty, New Zealand, designer of the 2009 NZ coins silver series

Norwegian
Caspar Herman Langberg (1811 Kristiansand, Norway - 1888 Kongsberg, Norway)
Gunnar Karelius Utsond  (1864 Kviteseid – 1950 Kviteseid, Norway)

Peruvian

Robert Henry Britten  (1832 UK – 1882 Lima, Peru)

Polish

 (1892 Warsaw – 1963 Wielen, Poland)

Tadeusz Breyer (1874 – 1952)
Bronisław Chromy (1925-2017)
 (1919 – 1991)
Józef Gosławski (1908 – 1963)
 (1935 Warsaw – )
Jerzy Jarnuszkiewicz (1919 – 2005)
Krystian Jarnuszkiewicz Signature: KJ
Wojciech Jastrzębowski (1884 Warsaw – 1963 Warsaw)
 (born 1956)
 (1862 – 1939)
 (1913 – 1991)
 (1915 – 1982)
Jerzy Nowakowski (born 1947)
 (1911 – 2000)
Krzysztof Szczepan Nitsch
Katarzyna Piskorska (1937 – 2010)
Stanisław Plęskowski
 (1935 – 1995)
 (1911 – 2000)
 (1934 – 1994)

Portuguese

Luís Filipe de Abreu (born 1935)
Caetano Alberto Nunes de Almeida (1795  –1851)
José Simões de Almeida (sobrinho) (1880 Figueiró dos Vinhos – 1950 Lisbon)
Leopoldo de Almeida (1898 – 1974)
Venâncio Pedro de Macedo Alves (1853 Lisbon - 1933)
Pedro Anjos Teixeira (1908 – 1997)
José Manuel Aurélio (born 1938)
Rogério dos Santos Azevedo (1898 – 1983)
Salvador Carvão da Silva d'Eça Barata Feyo (1899 – 1990)
Maria Barreira (1914-2010)
Baltazar Manuel Bastos
Gustavo Bastos (1928-2014)
Hélder Batista (1932-2015)
Avelino António Soares Belo (1872 – 1927)
João Paulo Póvoas Bento d'Almeida (born 1947)
 (1933 – 2017)
Numídico Bessone Borges de Medeiros Amorim (1913 – 1985)
João José Braga
Fernando Branco (born 1939 Lisbon, died 2020)
Álvaro João Vela de Brée (1903 – 1962)
José Maria Cabral Antunes (1916 – 1986)
Frederico Augusto de Campos (1814 Lisbon – 1895 Bemfica, Portugal). Signature: F. A. C.
Domingos António Cândido
José Cândido (born 1932)
Isabel Carriço (born 1943 at Coimbra)
Cassiano Augusto Vidal da Maia (1844 – 1895)
Dorita de Castel-Branco (1936 – 1996)
Luís dos Santos Castro Lobo
João Charters de Almeida (born 1935)
Jorge Coelho (1955)
Vasco Pereira da Conceição (1914-1992)
Fernando Conduto (born 1937)
Joaquim Correia (1920-2013)
Hélio Costa (born 1960)
Tomás Costa (medallist)
Vasco Gonçalves Costa (aka Vago) (1921-2005)
Rui Cunha
João Cutileiro (1937-2021)
Carlos Diniz
 (1912-1998)
Paulo Guilherme Ribeiro Dúlio Thomas d' Eça Leal (1932 Lisbon – 2010 Lisbon)
José Farinha (1920 – 1979)
Paulo Ferreira (1911-1999)
Manuel Carvalho Figueira
Francisco Xavier de Figueiredo (? – 1818)
João de Figueiredo (1725 – 1809)
João Fragoso (1913 – 2000)
Francisco Franco (1888 – 1955)
José Franco (1920 – 2009)
Francisco de Borja Freire (1791 – 1869)
C. Gama
António Lagoa-Henriques (1923 – 2009)
Manuel Inácio
Aureliano Lima (1916 – 1984)
Casimiro José de Lima (? – 1899)
António Lino (1914-1996)
Raul Sousa Machado (born 1921 Viseu, Portugal)
Manuel da Silva Lúcio
António Marinho (born 1945 at Guimarães)
Amaro Marques (? – 1797)
Joaquim Martins Correia (1910 – 1999)
Armando Matos Simões (born 1933)
Clara Menéres (1943-2018)
Paulo Aureliano Mengin (? – 1788)
Pedro António Mengin (? – 1795)
José Arnaldo Nogueira Molarinho (1828 – 1907)
Cipriano da Silva Moreira (1755 – 1826)
José de Moura (1915-2016)
Manuel da Silva Nogueira (born 1926)
Marcelino Norte de Almeida (1906 Lisbon - 1995)
António José Oliveira (1921-?)
João Oom (born 1937)
António Paiva
Luís Gonzaga Pereira (1796 – 1868)
Feliciano Avelino Peres (1821 – ?)
Rosa Ramalho (? – 1978)
Ramos de Abreu
Manuel de Morais Silva Ramos (? – 1872)
Domingos Alves Cevens do Rêgo (1873 Colmeias, Leiria - 1960 Lisbon)
Manuel Martins Ribeiro
 (1936-2016)
Francisco dos Santos (1878 Paião – 1930 Lisbon)
Inácio Santos
José Laranjeira Santos (born 1930)
José Sérgio Carvalho e Silva
João da Silva (1880 Lisbon – 1960 Lisbon)
José de Sousa
Augusto Jorge Ulisses
José António do Vale (1765 – 1842)
Euclides da Silva Vaz (1916-1991)
Raul da Vaza (born 1935)
Domingos Venâncio
Jorge Ricardo da Conceição Vieira (1922 – 1998)
Maria Irene Lima de Matos Vilar (1930 – 2008)
Raul Maria Xavier (1894 – 1964)

Romanian

Démètre "Anastase" Anastasescu (born 1909, year of death unknown)
Haralambie Ionescu (1913 Curtea de Argeș - 1977 Bucharest)
Ion Jalea (1887 – 1983)

Russian

Alexander Vasilyevich Baklanov (1954  Shishkina, Vagay district–)
Alexander Paulovich Lyalin (1802 – 1862)
Alexey Koroluck (1933 – 2002)
Remir Kharitonov (USSR)
Count Feodor Petrovitch Tolstoy (1783 – 1873)
Yevgeny Vuchetich (USSR) (1908 – 1974)

Serbian

Zlatara Majdanpek (Gold Refinery Belgrade established 1969)

Slovak

 (1851 – 1924)
 (1919 Mařatice – 2010 Bratislava)

South African

Willie Myburg (Die-sinker at the South African Mint 1965 – 1989)
Thomas Sasseen (Die-sinker at the South African Mint 1959 – 1974)
Coert Steynberg (1905 – 1982). Signature: C.L.S.

Spanish

Mariano Benlliure y Gil (1862 Valencia, Spain - 1947 Madrid)
Fernando Calico Rebull (1909-?) 
Begoña Castellanos Garcia (1967- ) Designer of the 1st Spanish Euro coins
Salvador Felipé Jacinto Dalí (1904 – 1989)
Luis José Díaz Salas (1967- ) Designer of the 1st Spanish Euro coins
Alberto Estruch (1830 Barcelona - 1884)
Luis Marchionni Hombrón (1815 Paris - 1894 Madrid)
 (1844 – 1926)
Teodoro Miciano Becerra (1903 Jerez de la Frontera - 1974 Madrid)  
Garcilaso Rollán (Designer of the 1st Spanish Euro coins)
Pablo Ruiz y Picasso (1881 – 1973)
Gregorio Sellán y González (1829 Madrid - after 1893)
 (1886 – 1972)
Jacopo da Trezzo (c. 1515 or 1519 – 1589), or Jacometrezo. Born in Italy
Remigio Vega (1787 Madrid - 1854 Madrid)

Swedish

Lea Ahlborn (1826 – 1897)
 (1840 – 1908)
 (1746 – 1798)
 (1880 – 1966)
 (1904 – 1989)
Ivar Viktor Johnsson (1885-1970)
Arvid Karlsteen (1947 - 1718)
Svante Kede (1877 – 1955)
Olof Lidijn, Mint-master in Stockholm, (1773 – 1819†)
 (1839 – 1916) 
J. Erik Lindberg (1873 – 1966)
 (1789 – 1853), Father of Pehr Henrik Lundgren
 (1824 – 1855) Signature PHL
Sebastian Tham, Mint-master in Stockholm 1855 – 1876, 1797 Forsvik, Sweden - 1876 Stockholm. Signature: S.T.

Swiss

Richard Emil Amsler (1859 Schaffhausen – 1934 Schaffhausen)
August Blaesi (1903 Stans – 1979 Luzern)
Hugues Bovy (1841 – 1903)
 (1857 – 1911)
 (1795 – 1877)
Hans Brandenberger (1912 Sumbawa, Dutch East Indies – 2003 Zürich, Switzerland)
Jacques-Antoine Dassier (1715 – 1759)
Jean Dassier (1676 – 1763)
Eugène-Baptiste Doumenc (born 1873, year of death unknown)
Jean-Pierre Droz (1746 – 1823)
Edouard Durussel (designer of Swiss shooting thalers, and medals after 1875)
Hans Frei (1868 Basel – 1947 Riehen)
Johann Baptist Frener (1821 – 1892)
Jules Holy (born 1872, year of death unknown)
Henri-Édouard Huguenin (1879 – c. 1919–20)
André Huguenin-Dumittan (1888 – 1975)
Fritz Huguenin-Jacot (born 1845, year of death unknown)
Alexander Hutter (1817 Constance - 1876 Bern)
Richard Kissling (1848 – 1919)
 (1842 – 1927)
Conrad Meyer (1618 – 1689)
Jean Henri Samuel Mognetti (1820 Geneva - 1904)
Johann Rudolf Ochs (1673 Berne – 1750 London) 
 
C. (Charles Jean) Richard (1832 Geneva, Switzerland -)
 (1761 – 1825)
 (1849 – 1918)
 (1897 Menziken, Aargau – 1982 Collonge-Bellerive, Genève, Switzerland)

United States

Robert Ingersoll Aitken (1878 – 1949)
Mark Aron (1910 – 1990)
Richard W. Baldwin (1921 – 2012)
Charles E. Barber (1840 – 1917)
William Barber (1807 – 1879)
Leonard Baskin (1922 – 2000) 
Chester Beach (1881 – 1956)
Abram Belskie (1907 – 1988)
Stanley Bleifeld (1924 – 2011)
Victor David Brenner (1871 – 1924)
George Thomas Brewster (1862 – 1943)
Gaetano Cecere (1894 – 1985)
Rene Paul Chambellan (1893 – 1955)
Herring Coe (1907 – 1999)
Joseph Arthur Coletti 
Robert Cronbach (1908 – 2001)
Eugene L. Daub (born 1942)
T. James Ferrell (1939-2020, Clayton, New Jersey)
Anthony de Francisci (1887 – 1964)
Donald Harcourt De Lue (1897 – 1988)
René Theophile de Quélin (1853 – 1931)
Frank Eliscu (1912 – 1996)
Donald Nelson Everhart II (born 1949 York, Pennsylvania)
John F. Flanagan (1865 – 1952)
James Earle Fraser (1876 – 1953)
Laura Gardin Fraser (1889 – 1966)
Daniel Chester French (1850 – 1931)
Moritz Fuerst (1782 – 1840)
Frank Gasparro (1909 – 2001)
Christian Gobrecht (1785 – 1844)
Edward Ryneal Grove (1912 — 2002)
Gladys Gunzer (1939 – 2016)
Laszlo Ispanky (1919 – 2010)
Carl Paul Jennewein (1890 – 1978)
Elizabeth Jones (born 1935 in Montclair New Jersey), Signature: EJ
Marcel Jovine (1921 – 2003)
Julio Kilenyi (1885 – 1959)
Mario Korbel (1882 – 1954)
Georg Albrecht (Albert) Ferdinand Küner (1819 Lindau, Germany – 1906 San Francisco, California)
Michael Lantz (1908 – 1988)
Leo Lentelli (1879 – c. 1961/2)
James B. Longacre (1794 – 1869)
George Hampden Lovett (1824 Philadelphia – 1894 Brooklyn, New York) 
Bruno Lucchesi (1860 – 1924)
Henry Augustus Lukeman (1872 – 1935)
Oronzio Maldarelli (1892 – 1963)
Edward Francis McCartan (1879 – 1947)
Ralph Joseph Menconi (1915 – 1972)
John M. Mercanti (born 1943 in Philadelphia) Signature: JM
Albert F. Michini (1925 Philadelphia, Pennsylvania – 1994 Coatesville, Pennsylvania) Signature: am
Richard McDermott Miller (1922 – 2004)
Berthold Nebel (1889 – 1964)
Norman E. Nemeth (1942 Newport News, Virginia – 2012 West Chester, Pennsylvania). Signature: NN
Edmondo Quattrocchi (1889 – 1966)
Christian Petersen (Danish - American, 1886 - 1961) 
Johann (John) Matthias Reich (1768 Fürth, Bavaria, Germany – 1833 Albany, New York) 
Joseph Emile Renier (1877–1966)
Richard Renninger (1918 Boyertown, Pennsylvania – 1995 Springfield, Delaware County)
Gilroy Roberts (1905 – 1992) Signature: GR (monogram)
Augustus Saint-Gaudens (1848 – 1907)
Hans Schaefer (1875 Sternberg, Moravia – 1933 Chicago, Illinois)
Alexander "Alex" George Shagin (born 1947)
John Ray Sinnock (1888 – 1947)
Ken Smith (1951-2020)
Jonathan M Swanson (1888 Chicago – 1963 New York)
Lorado Zadoc Taft (1860 – 1936)
Henry van Wolf (1898 – 1982)
Adolph Alexander Weinman (1870 – 1952)
Robert Weinman (1915 – 2003)
Dennis R. Williams (born 1952 Erie, Pennsylvania) Signature: DRW 
Sherl Joseph Winter (born 1934 in Dayton, Ohio) Signature: JW
Charles Cushing Wright (1796 Damariscotta, Maine  – 1854 New York). Signature: C.C.W. 
Emil Zettler (1878 – 1946)

Mints specializing in art medals

Medallic Art Company
Monnaie de Paris (Paris Mint) (founded in 864)
Mathew Holland, of Bigbury Mint Ltd , Devon, United Kingdom (Founded in 1980, incorporated in 2000). Matthew Holland: Designer of The Promise, Art Medal (British Art Medal Society, New Art Medal 2003)

References

Numismatics
Exonumia

Medallists
Production of coins